Kilit is an extinct Iranian dialect of Azerbaijan that is closely related to Talysh. It is probably a dialect of Iranian Tati, otherwise found only in Iran, specifically a subdialect of Harzandi. It was spoken in the villages around Kilit, located 12 kilometers southwest from the city of Ordubad in a district with the same name of Nakhchivan in Azerbaijan. It was still used by non-native speakers as a second language in the 1950s.

History 

The language has been long known to the Russian historians and travelers since the middle of nineteenth to the mid-twentieth centuries. The historian Chopin, first mentioned it back in 1852.  He states the inhabitants of the village as amounting to 104. Zelinsky researched on the language in 1880 afterwards. In the 1950s a few speakers was reported who used the language probably only as a trade lingo or secret language. In 1966, A. G. Gasanov collected a few words and phrases. Although the possibility of a migration cannot be ruled out, however it is more likely, given more data about Tatic languages and proto-Tatic, that this group extended at least as far as the areas in which the remanent languages are spoken today.

Some available materials 

The following is a kiliti text reported by Zelinsky: Transliterated from Cyrillic :

Comparative list of numbers and some words mentioned by Zelinsky and Gasanov:

The identity 

Chopin remarks that the inhabitants of Kilit village were professing Shiite faith and their language is not similar to any of the other local dialects. However he has been puzzled about their origin. He mentioned that they might be from Armenian origin or more likely Talyshi, Tat, Tajik or Zoroastrian. Zelinsky considered it as a mixture of Kurdish, Persian and Arabic. Gasanov called it with a certain affinity towards  Iranian languages. But only Zelinsky's materials are enough to understand that kiliti is not an argot, possesses an independent grammatical structure and have the main base of the root words and all the typical features of the Iranian languages.  The existing materials also provide a sufficient basis to determine it as belonging to the northwestern Iranian group of languages. That language had no written tradition. According to Zelinsky, dozens of villages had spoken the language before, but it was just understandable to the villagers afterwards and then the Azerbaijani language replaced it.

References and notes

Further reading 
 Talysh.com Talyshi International Forum 

Northwestern Iranian languages
Languages of Azerbaijan
Extinct languages
Languages extinct in the 20th century
Caspian languages